Elections to Hyndburn Borough Council were held on 6 May 2010. One third of the council was up for election. Since there was also the General Election being held on the same day, overall voter turnout was much higher than usual, for such local elections.

Background
Before the election  Conservatives had a majority of 21 councillors, Labour had 13 councillors, while Independent (politician) had 1 councillor.

Conservative candidates contested every ward, Labour candidates contested all wards except Overton-ward. Independents contested seven-wards, not including their one-existing uncontested-seat.  LibDem's only single candidate contested in the Spring Hill-ward.  BNP's only single candidate contested in the Clayton-le-Moors-ward.

Local Election result
After the election, the composition of the council was -

Conservative 18
Labour 15
Independent 2

Reference: 2006 Hyndburn Borough Council election#Local Election result

NB: Five (of the 16) Council ward seats that were NOT up for re-election in 2014 included the following wards - Altham, Baxenden and Church, plus Barnfield and Central in Accrington.

Ward results

Clayton-le-Moors

Huncoat

Immanuel

Milnshaw

Netherton

Overton

Peel

Rishton

Spring Hill

St. Andrew's

St. Oswald's

References

http://news.bbc.co.uk/1/shared/election2010/council/html/3707.stm
https://web.archive.org/web/20140525200131/http://www.hyndburnbc.gov.uk/site/custom_scripts/elections/electionresults.php?electionid=1

2010 English local elections
May 2010 events in the United Kingdom
2010
2010s in Lancashire